The 1990 Tennessee gubernatorial election took place on November 6, 1990. Incumbent Democrat Ned McWherter was successfully re-elected, defeating his Republican opponent Dwight Henry, a little-known one term member of the Tennessee House of Representatives.

General election

References

1990 in Tennessee
Gubernatorial
1990
Tennessee